This is a list of properties and districts in Dodge County, Georgia that are listed on the National Register of Historic Places (NRHP).

Current listings

|}

References

Dodge
Buildings and structures in Dodge County, Georgia